Waman Ch'arpa (Quechua waman falcon or variable hawk, ch'arpa gold nugget, Hispanicized spelling Huamancharpa) is a mountain in the Andes of Peru, about  high. It is located in the Apurímac Region, Abancay Province, Lambrama District, and in the Grau Province, Curpahuasi District. It lies west of the lakes named Chinaqucha and Urququcha.

References

Mountains of Peru
Mountains of Apurímac Region